Latham Circle Mall was an enclosed shopping mall located adjacent to the Latham Circle (the intersection of US 9 and NY 2) in Latham, New York. Built in 1957 as Latham Corners Shopping Center, the mall was renovated several times in its history, most notably in 1977 when it became a fully enclosed and temperature-controlled shopping mall.

Around the mid 2000s, the mall started to lose tenants, eventually becoming a dead mall. By 2013, the mall was to be redeveloped and shuttered while JCPenney, which has been part of the complex since it opened in 1957, remained. Demolition of the mall began in March of that year.

History 
The Latham Circle Mall was a shopping mall located next to Latham Circle in Latham, New York. it opened in 1957 as an open-air plaza called Latham Corners Shopping Center, before being converted into an enclosed mall in 1977. The new mall featured a JCPenney (which stayed over from the original 1957 strip), Woolworth, and Boston Store as anchors. The mall was expanded in 1988 to include a Caldor, a new JCPenney store to replace the old one, and a second level which would house the ten-screen movie theater. The two-level space occupied by The Boston Store closed in the late 1980s due to a fire. The store closed for remodeling and was replaced by Burlington Coat Factory in the early 1990s.

Woolworth closed in 1995 and was replaced in 1998 with Stein Mart, which subsequently closed in 2001. A Gold's Gym later moved in there from a former Grand Union next to the mall, which has been demolished. They left in April 2005 to move to a new location on Route 2.  Also, Caldor closed in early 1999 when the chain went out of business. The Caldor wing was demolished in 2003 for a Lowe's, which did not open out to the mall. Many other tenants began to leave during the 2000s, leaving Latham Circle as a dead mall.

In February 2010, owners of the mall were in talks with a major retailer to occupy the open space, which subsequently did not happen.
In May 2012, Burlington Coat Factory closed, leaving Regal Cinema and JCPenney. In early 2013, Regal Cinemas closed their cinema, leaving only JCPenney, which had been there since 1957, as the last tenant. In March 2013, demolition of the Latham Circle Mall began, to make way for a new shopping center.

JCPenney closed this location around January 4, 2014.

Cancelled renovation 
It was reported on May 19, 2007, by all major Albany media outlets that plans were underway to renovate the mall. The plan would have involved a complete refacing of the building, as well as several new tenants. The renovation never materialized, however. Latham Circle Mall had since faced foreclosure and was in debt for $21 million.

New ownership
In September 2009, the mall's Boston-area lender, LR6-A Latham L.L.C., bought the property at auction. The lender, which is an affiliate of the real estate investment firm Realty Financial Partners of Wellesley, Massachusetts, brought foreclosure proceedings against the mall last year.

New leasing effort
On May 2, 2011, CB Richard Ellis took over leasing at Latham Circle Mall. They released a new redevelopment plan, which aimed to be a mixture of anchor stores, small shops, restaurants and grocery. This plan involved removing most, if not all, of the indoor mall portion. Existing anchor stores such as JC Penney and Lowe's would remain in their current locations.

On August 21, 2012, a new redevelopment plan was proposed by the Grossman Development Group, named the Shoppes at Latham Circle.  That latest proposal would have retained the JCPenney and Lowe's stores, with the Regal Cinema also remaining for a minimum of two years. However, Regal later decided to pull out of the mall altogether. Demolition began in March 2013. Also in March, Dick's Sporting Goods announced it would be the first tenant at the newly proposed Shoppes At Latham Circle. In April 2014, Walmart announced that they would build a new Supercenter at the new plaza to replace a discount store at the nearby Latham Farms plaza. After JCPenney closed in January 2014, a revised plan was later released by Grossman that called for the remaining portion of the mall that housed JCPenney and Regal Cinemas being replaced by more retail space. It was later announced that this portion of the mall would be demolished in August 2014. A further update to the plan now included a proposed Bob's Discount Furniture store and LA Fitness gym.

By January 4, 2014, Lowe's was the only business left open on the property.

As of July 12, 2018, the plaza now contains a Walmart Supercenter, Bob's Discount Furniture, Burlington Coat Factory (again), a GameStop, a Moe's, a pizza place, and Jersey Mike's Subs.

References

External links
Latham Circle Mall on Deadmalls.com

Colonie, New York
Shopping malls in Albany County, New York
U.S. Route 9
Shopping malls established in 1957
1957 establishments in New York (state)
2012 disestablishments in New York (state)
Demolished shopping malls in the United States
Demolished buildings and structures in New York (state)
Buildings and structures demolished in 2014